Sharon Church (born 1948; died 2022) was an American studio jeweler, metalsmith, and educator.  She is a professor emerita of the University of the Arts (Philadelphia) in Philadelphia, Pennsylvania.  In 2012, Church was elected a Fellow of the American Craft Council (ACC). In 2018, she received a Lifetime Achievement Award from the Society of North American Goldsmiths.

Early Years
Sharon Church was born in 1948 in Richland, Washington to Gilbert Patterson Church  and Winona Skinner. Church grew up in Wilmington, Delaware, graduating from the Tower Hill School, Class of 1966. Her father was a construction engineer for DuPont Co, and she recalls growing up watching her mother doing craft work and wearing jewelry.

Education
In 1970, Church earned a B.S. from Skidmore College, where she was a student of Earl Pardon.
She began working with wood while at Skidmore College. She was encouraged to be a carver and work substractively as a student of Albert Paley during her first year at graduate school. Church earned an M.F.A. from The School for American Craftsmen at the Rochester Institute of Technology in 1973.

Teaching
In 1979 Church moved from Wilmington, Delaware, to Philadelphia, Pennsylvania to begin teaching at the Philadelphia College of Art (later Craft + Material Studies program at University of the Arts (Philadelphia)) After 35 years, she retired in 2014, becoming professor emerita.

Making
Sharon Church is known for carving materials like wood, horn, and bone and sometimes incorporating them into works with precious metals and stones. She often uses Castello boxwood or ebony. Church often begins with a drawing, but does not plan out the entire piece. She slowly develops her pieces through trial and error, experimenting with processes, techniques and materials until she feels a piece is complete. If she cannot resolve a piece, she may put it away, discard it or reclaim the materials.

She draws heavily on nature both as a model and for materials. Following the death of her first husband in 1993, Church began to make carved wood a key element of her jewelry and sculptures. Her first piece in this style, It was the Most Beautiful Day of the Summer (1995), resembles both a fox's head and a cloven heart, in gold and ebony.

Professional Activities
Church has served on the board of directors of the Society of North American Goldsmiths (1983-1987). She has been the production coordinator for Metalsmith magazine (1986-1987) and served on its editorial advisory committee. She has written for Metalsmith and other magazines. She is a member of the American Craft Council and of Art Jewelry Forum.

Public Collections
Church's work is included in the permanent collections of the
Yale University Art Gallery;
Metropolitan Museum of Art;
Museum of Arts and Design, New York City;
Museum of Fine Arts, Boston;
Pinakothek der Moderne, Munich, Germany;
National Gallery of Australia;
Museum of Fine Arts Houston;
State Hermitage Museum St. Petersburg, Russia; Los Angeles County Museum of Art; Philadelphia Museum of Art;
 and the Delaware Art Museum. Her work, Oh No!, was acquired by the Smithsonian American Art Museum as part of the Renwick Gallery's 50th Anniversary Campaign.

Awards and honors
 2018, Lifetime Achievement Award, Society of North American Goldsmiths (SNAG)
 2018, Distinguished Artist, James Renwick Alliance
 2015, “Master of American Craft”, American Craft Council.
 2012. Elected Fellow, American Craft Council College of Fellows
 2010, Medal of Distinction, Philadelphia Art Alliance
 2008,  Distinguished Educator Award, James Renwick Alliance
 2004, Richard C. von Hess Faculty Prize, University of the Arts
 1999, Lindback Distinguished Teaching Award, University of the Arts
 1977, Craftsmen’s Fellowship, National Endowment for the Arts

References

External links 
 Oral history interview with Sharon Church McNabb 1990 from Columbia Center for Oral History, Columbia University

1948 births
Living people
Skidmore College alumni
Rochester Institute of Technology alumni
University of the Arts (Philadelphia) faculty
American women artists
American jewelry designers
21st-century American women
Women jewellers